The 2016–17 season was Bologna Football Club 1909's second season back in Serie A, after the club's relegation at the end of the 2013–14 season.

Season review

The club competed in Serie A, finishing 15th, and in the Coppa Italia, where they were eliminated in the round of 16.

Players

Squad information

Lega Serie A had limited the squad to the maximum of 25 players, including at least 4 home grown players and 4 additional club-trained players (marked as CT). However, under-21 players (born 1995 or after in this season; marked as U21) were not limited. Mirante was left out from the squad list due to injury from September to 20 November, plus one unknown player was not registered (Acquafresca according to report), making Bologna squad was composite of 23 players that over 21 of age, including 2 players trained by Bologna, from September 2016 to January 2017. Bologna reinstated Mirante by replacing Gomis in November, thanks to a clause in the regulation that allow to swap goalkeeper even out of transfer window, which Gomis replaced Mirante again in Italian Cup once. After the winter transfer window Bologna squad was trimmed to 20 players plus 6 Under-21 players.

Transfers

In

Loans in

Out

Loans out

Pre-season and friendlies

Competitions

Overall

Last updated: 28 May 2017

Serie A

League table

Results summary

Results by round

Matches

Coppa Italia

Statistics

Appearances and goals

|-
! colspan=14 style=background:#DCDCDC; text-align:center| Goalkeepers

|-
! colspan=14 style=background:#DCDCDC; text-align:center| Defenders

|-
! colspan=14 style=background:#DCDCDC; text-align:center| Midfielders

|-
! colspan=14 style=background:#DCDCDC; text-align:center| Forwards

|-
! colspan=14 style=background:#DCDCDC; text-align:center| Players transferred out during the season

Goalscorers

Last updated: 27 May 2017

Clean sheets

Last updated: 27 May 2017

Disciplinary record

Last updated: 27 May 2017

References

Bologna F.C. 1909 seasons
Bologna